The Great Midwest Conference men's basketball tournament was the conference championship tournament in men's basketball for the Great Midwest Conference (GMC). The tournament was held annually between 1992 and 1995, when the Great Midwest Conference was absorbed into Conference USA in 1996.

The winner of the tournament was guaranteed a spot in the NCAA basketball tournament each year.

Tournament champions by year

Championships and finals appearances by school

See also
Conference USA men's basketball tournament (from 1996)

References